The Library of the Royal Institute of Asturian Studies (Biblioteca del Real Instituto de Estudios Asturianos; BARIDEA) is a public entity containing the bibliographic heritage and documentation of Asturias.
It was  formally founded in the summer of 1946 at 3 Calle San Vicente in Oviedo, but moved to its present location in  the Palacio Conde de Toreno on the Plaza de Porlier in 1957. It  specialises in bibliographic documents and documentaries on Asturias and is one of the centres of study for the Royal Institute of Asturian Studies (RIDEA). It has a collection of about 20,000 volumes.

Gallery

References

Bibliography
Toyos, Ana Belén de los, Catálogo de libros de fondo asturiano, Oviedo, RIDEA, 1996 (in Spanish)
Castaño Rodríguez, María José, Catálogo de libros del fondo antiguo, Oviedo, RIDEA, 1996 (in Spanish)
Fondo fotográfico del IDEA: 40 años de cultura asturiana (2), 1946–1986, Oviedo, RIDEA, 1989 (in Spanish)

External links
Official website

Asturian culture
Libraries in Spain
1946 establishments in Spain
Libraries established in 1946
Buildings and structures in Oviedo